The TK-80 (μCOM Training Kit TK-80) was an 8080-based single-board computer kit developed by Nippon Electric Company (NEC) in 1976. It was originally developed for engineers who considered using the μCOM-80 family in their product. It was successful among hobbyists in late 1970s in Japan, due to its reasonable price and an expensive computer terminal not being required.

History 
NEC started as a telecommunications equipment vendor, and their business was heavily dependent on Nippon Telegraph and Telephone Public Corporation (NTT). To increase private demand and exports, NEC began developing new industries such as computers and semiconductors in the 1950s. Although those businesses were not profitable enough, NEC continued investing profits from successful telecommunication business.

In the 1970s, the Semiconductor Division developed several microprocessors including Intel compatible processors, and in 1976 got a second-source agreement with Intel to produce the 8080 microprocessor legally. However, the division had trouble marketing them. In Japan, few engineers were interested in microprocessors, and NEC salesmen couldn't find what kind of demand would make much profit.

In February 1976, the Semiconductor and Integrated Circuit Sales Division formed the Microcomputer Sales Section, and began to provide development environments for their microprocessors. , who was formerly manager of the Automation Promotion Section, became its section manager. However, they visited customers and explained, but it was difficult for them to understand how to use a microprocessor. At the same time, NEC received an order from a laboratory in the Yokosuka Communication Institute of NTT that they wanted an educational microcomputer product for their new employees. , a member of the section, proposed to Watanabe developing an educational kit. Based on this kit, the TK-80 was developed for general engineers and aimed to create a demand for microprocessors outside the industrial field.

Gotō mainly designed the TK-80, and  did the detailed design work. Gotō got an idea from a photo of the KIM-1. The KIM-1 can monitor and show the current address by the software, but the display disappears when the CPU is hanging. The TK-80 has the Dynamic Display using the 555 timer IC and interrupt the CPU, it can always show the current address. In addition, the TK-80 has a CMOS battery. He decided to document its manual with a circuit diagram and assembly code of the debug monitor, influenced by the PDP-8 which was an open architecture and was used as an IC tester at NEC. 

The TK-80 came out on August 3, 1976. It was priced at 88,500 yen, an engineer's section manager could approve at that time. NEC had opened a support center (Bit-INN) at the Akihabara Radio Kaikan on September 13, 1976. They found many machines were sold to not only electrical engineers but also businessmen, hobbyists and students. The TK-80 was sold more than 2,000 units per month, despite 200 units expected.

Soon after its success, other Japanese microprocessor manufacturers developed an evaluation kit for their microprocessor. Power supplies and other peripherals came out from third parties. Watanabe and his members wrote an introductory book  in July 1977, it became very popular and sold more than 200,000 copies.

When Kato worked for the help desk at Bit-INN, a doctor asked him how to use the TK-80 for calculating medical costs on the point system, and a store manager asked him whether it could process sales information. He noticed users were trying to use the TK-80 as a computer rather than a training kit. However, the TK-80 lacked memory and expandability to use for practical purposes. Around the same time, a third party manufacturer suggested an expansion board to provide TV output and a BASIC interpreter. The TK-80BS was built upon that board, and was released in the end of 1977. Its BASIC was designed to fit in 4 KB of ROM, had the same as Li-Chen Wang's Tiny BASIC except some differences in functions and statements. Its functions and speed didn't satisfy users. This led to the development of a new machine which became the PC-8001.

In Japan, the Altair 8800 was sold in 1975, but not successful due to its high brokerage fee. Neither was the Apple II nor the Commodore PET. Single-board computers had been popular until the successor PC-8001 came out in 1979.

Variants 
The TK-80E was a cost-reduced version priced at 67,000 yen, introduced in 1977. It contained the NEC μPD8080AF (2 MHz), fully compatible with the Intel 8080A. (The original μPD8080A has an incompatibility in the BCD adjustment, the μPD8080AF does not.). Other specifications included 768 B (Max. Up to 1 KB expandable) of ROM, and 512 B (Max. Up to 1 KB expandable) of RAM.

The TK-80BS was an expansion kit introduced in 1977. It included a keyboard, a backplane and an expansion board for the TK-80 with 5 KB of RAM and 12 KB of ROM. It supported 8K BASIC.

The COMPO BS/80 was a fully assembled unit of the TK-80BS, introduced in 1978. It was not a success because of its poor built-in BASIC and slow clock speed.

The TK-85 was introduced in May 1980 and was the successor to the TK-80E. It contained the μPD8085AC processor (2.4576 MHz) and has a system configuration that is considered to some extent for compatibility with the TK-80. Other specifications included 2 KB (Max. Up to 8 KB expandable) of ROM, 1 KB of RAM, while the board size was 310 × 220 mm. It supported BASIC.

The PDA-80 was a development platform for NEC's microprocessors. It had the μPD8080A processor, 8 KB of RAM, a teleprinter interface and a self assembler for its processor.

Literature

References

External links 

 
 
  (Japanese language)
  (Japanese language. Photos & overview plus pages for TK-80BS & COMPO BS/80.)
  (Japanese language. Photos for TK-80 & detailed overview for TK-80 models.)
  (Japanese language. Photos & overview for TK-80BS (BASIC STATION).)
  (Japanese language. Photos & overview for TK-85, and specifications comparison chart with TK-80.)
  (Japanese language. Photos & overview for TK-85.)

NEC personal computers
Computer-related introductions in 1976
Early microcomputers